Two warships of Japan have borne the name Suma :

 , a  launched in 1895 and stricken in 1923
 , an  launched in 1915 as HMS Moth and scuttled in 1941. Subsequently, refloated and renamed in 1942 she served in the Japanese Navy until her sinking in 1945.

See also
 , protected cruiser class of the Imperial Japanese Navy, whose lead ship was Suma

Japanese Navy ship names
Imperial Japanese Navy ship names